Con las manos en la masa is a Spanish cooking show by Televisión Española, directed and presented by Elena Santonja, aired between 1984 and 1991 on TVE-2. It is the first ever Spanish cooking show in the history of television.

History
Although Televisión Española had already produced some shows talking about gastronomy and home economics, such as A mesa y mantel in 1958,  in 1967–68, Gastronomía in 1970 and the game show  in 1980, Con las manos en la masa was the first show actually preparing one or more dishes over the course of an episode, taking the viewing audience through the food's inspiration, preparation, and stages of cooking on Spanish television. The first episode aired on January 10, 1984 and the first dish cooked was a fried egg.

In each episode, Santonja welcomes and interviews a celebrity while the two explain and prepare two recipes in the kitchen on the studio, almost always related to traditional Spanish cuisine. Many celebrities from the entertainment industry, culture, sports, and even politics appear on the show.

In May 1991, the show was transformed into La cocina de Elena. In August, Televisión Española abruptly canceled the new show when Santonja refused to include product placement on it. Six episodes already recorded were not aired.

References

External links
 
 Con las manos en la masa at RTVE Play

Spanish cooking television series
RTVE shows
1984 Spanish television series debuts
1991 Spanish television series endings